Sørfugløya or Sør-Fugløy is a small (97 ha) uninhabited island and nature reserve in Karlsøy Municipality, Troms og Finnmark county, in Arctic northern Norway. It lies just north-west of the larger inhabited island of Rebbenesøya. It is a steep island with grassy slopes surrounded by boulder scree. It, with its adjacent marine waters, has been designated a 760 ha Important Bird Area (IBA) by BirdLife International because it supports large breeding colonies of Atlantic puffins and razorbills. European storm petrels also breed on the island.

References

 

Karlsøy
Islands of Troms og Finnmark
Nature reserves in Norway
Important Bird Areas of Norway
Important Bird Areas of Arctic islands
Seabird colonies